The women's 200 metres event at the 1974 British Commonwealth Games was held on 27 and 29 January at the Queen Elizabeth II Park in Christchurch, New Zealand.

Medalists

Results

Heats
Held on 27 January

Qualification: First 3 in each heat (Q) and the next 1 fastest (q) qualify for the semifinals.

Wind:Heat 1: +2.3 m/s, Heat 2: +0.9 m/s, Heat 3: +0.1 m/s, Heat 4: +1.9 m/s, Heat 5: +0.1 m/s

Semifinals
Held on 27 January

Qualification: First 4 in each semifinal (Q) qualify directly for the final.

Wind:Heat 1: +0.2 m/s, Heat 2: +0.4 m/s

Final
Held on 29 January

Wind: +0.6 m/s

References

Heats results
Semifinals results

Athletics at the 1974 British Commonwealth Games
1974